Linköpings  may  refer to:

Linköpings ASS, Linköpings Allmänna Simsällskap is a Swedish swim team
Linköpings FC, an association football club 
Linköpings FF, premier men's football team
Linköpings HC, Linköpings Hockey Club

See also
 Linköping